The Cat Creeps is a 1946 American film directed by Erle C. Kenton.

Plot

Cast

Style
The authors of the book Universal Horrors noted that by the mid-1940s the popularity of horror films was apparently waning" noting that Universal kept making them despite their major stars Boris Karloff and Bela Lugosi had left the company and other players such as Lionel Atwill George Zucco and John Carradine had also left. Retrospective sources such Hal Erickson referred to the film stated that despite the film being promoted as a "typical Universal horror film" the film was "more of a crime melodrama". The authors of Universal Horrors described the film as a "horror-whodunnit".

Production
The Cat Creeps went into production on January 3, 1946. George Robinson was the director of photography but was replaced by an uncredited Elwood Bredell towards the later stages of filming. The crew of the film were advised by censors not to include the word "Witch" in the film as "there can be no possible confusion with the unacceptable word 'bitch'" and to avoid scenes of cruelty to the titular cat in the film. The film completed production in 13 days, one day over schedule.

Release
The Cat Creeps was distributed theatrically by the Universal Pictures Company on May 17, 1946. The film was double billed with She-Wolf of London. The film is still under copyright because the copyright was renewed in 1973.

Critical reception
From contemporary reviews, Jack D. Grant of The Hollywood Reporter found the film was "exactly what the tight-knitted mystery subject deserved. Nor are faults to be found with the casting or the suspenseful direction of the practiced Erle C. Kenton". Bosley Crowther of The New York Times stated the film was "a routine little thriller, with feeble attempts at comedy" and that "the cat gives a pretty good performance but it gets mediocre support". Wanda Hale of The New York Daily News declared the film as "the least effective murder mystery that has been made in years" stating that the film "has the appearance of having been thrown together in about the same length of time" and that "the performances, if possible, are worse than the production". Otis L. Guernsey, Jr. of the New York Herald Tribune found that "there is nothing either frightening or mysterious about the law-breaking in The Cat Creeps, and it is not quite silly enough to be laughable".

From retrospective reviews, Hal Erickson of AllMovie described the film as "not a particularly distinguished [ crime melodrama]...Though blessed with an unusually strong supporting cast, The Cat Creeps is strictly B material". The authors of Universal Horrors commented that the film was "forgettable" noting that "even today, the mention of the title prompts horror buffs to think instantly of the 1930 The Cat Creeps - a lost film which few if any of them have ever seen". In 1962, Joe Dante included the film in his list of worst horror films list in Famous Monsters. Dante stated the film was "shamefully un-mysterious mystery with supernatural overtones. Just another grade B murder-in-the-mansion potboiler".

References

Footnotes

Sources

External links

 
 
 

1946 films
Films directed by Erle C. Kenton
Films set in country houses
American mystery films
Universal Pictures films
American black-and-white films
1940s American films